Juliette and Juliette (French: Juliette et Juliette) is a 1974 French-Italian comedy film directed by Rémo Forlani and starring Annie Girardot, Marlène Jobert and Pierre Richard.

Cast
 Annie Girardot as Juliette Vidal 
 Marlène Jobert as Juliette Rozenec 
 Pierre Richard as Bob Rozenec 
 Alfred Adam as Monsieur Rozenec
 Robert Beauvais as Pénélope's boss
 Dominique Briand as Laurent 
 Paulette Dubost as Madame Rozenec 
 Ginette Garcin as Miss Quiblier 
 Christine Dejoux as Nicole 
 Philippe Léotard as The seducer

References

Bibliography 
 Dayna Oscherwitz & MaryEllen Higgins. The A to Z of French Cinema. Scarecrow Press, 2009.

External links 
 

1974 films
1974 comedy films
French comedy films
Italian comedy films
1970s French-language films
1970s French films
1970s Italian films